The White House is a historic house at 1101 Perry Street in Helena, Arkansas.  It is a two-story brick building, built in 1910 to a design by architect Charles L. Thompson.  The Colonial Revival building has a pyramidal roof with projecting gable sections.  A single-story porch wraps around two sides of the house, supported by grouped Tuscan columns.  The front entry is framed by sidelight windows and pilasters.  It is the only surviving Thompson design (of seven known) in Helena.

The house was listed on the National Register of Historic Places in 1982.

See also
National Register of Historic Places listings in Phillips County, Arkansas

References

Houses on the National Register of Historic Places in Arkansas
Houses completed in 1910
Houses in Phillips County, Arkansas
Colonial Revival architecture in Arkansas
National Register of Historic Places in Phillips County, Arkansas